Mosa may refer to:

 Mosa Meat, Dutch food technology company
 Mosa (surname), multiple people

See also 

 Moza (disambiguation)
 Mossa (disambiguation)